Liam Ryan may refer to:

 Liam Ryan (Dublin hurler) (born 1978), Dublin Senior hurler
 Liam Ryan (Limerick hurler) (1936–2015), Irish hurler
 Liam Ryan (Wexford hurler) (born 1995), Irish hurler
 Liam Ryan (footballer) (born 1996), Australian rules footballer

See also
William Ryan (disambiguation)